Alan Rivett (born 21 March 1956) is a former international speedway rider from Australia.

Speedway career 
Rivett reached the final of the Speedway World Pairs Championship in the 1988 Speedway World Pairs Championship. Despite riding for Australia he was called up to replace injured New Zealand rider David Bargh in the final.

He rode in the top tier of British Speedway, riding for various clubs.

At the 1986 Australian Individual Speedway Championship, he won the bronze medal.

World Final appearances

World Pairs Championship
 1988 -  Bradford, Odsal Stadium (with Mitch Shirra) - 4th - 32pts

References 

1956 births
Australian speedway riders
New Zealand speedway riders
Peterborough Panthers riders
Exeter Falcons riders
King's Lynn Stars riders
Long Eaton Invaders riders
Berwick Bandits riders
Living people